Annicka Dolonius is a Filipina character actress best known for her award-winning performances in Philippine New Wave films such as Pisay (2007) Ang Nawawala (2012) and Apocalypse Child (2015). She has also appeared in various commercial film and television roles.

See also 
 Ang Nawawala
 Apocalypse Child
 Monster Jimenez

References 

20th-century Filipino actresses
Filipino film actresses
Living people
Year of birth missing (living people)
Place of birth missing (living people)